{{Speciesbox
|name = Swamp gum
|image = Eucalyptus ovata.jpg
|image_caption = Eucalyptus ovata in Maranoa Gardens
|status = VU
|status_system = IUCN3.1
|status_ref = 
|genus = Eucalyptus
|species = ovata
|authority = Labill.
|synonyms_ref =
|synonyms = Eucalyptus muelleri Naudin nom. illeg.
|range_map =E. ovata.JPG
|range_map_caption =E. ovata, field distribution
|}}Eucalyptus ovata, commonly known as swamp gum or black gum, is a small to medium-sized tree species that is endemic to south-eastern Australia. It has mostly smooth bark, glossy green, lance-shaped to egg-shaped adult leaves, green flower buds in groups of seven, white flowers and conical to bell-shaped fruit.

It has smooth, grey, whitish or pinkish-grey new bark, sometimes with loose rough bark near the base of larger trees. Flowering mainly occurs from June to November and the flowers are white.

Taxonomy and namingEucalyptus ovata was first formally described in 1806 by Jacques Labillardière in Novae Hollandiae Plantarum Specimen. The specific epithet (ovata) is from the Latin ovatus, referring to the leaf shape.

In 1916, Joseph Maiden described two varieties of E. ovata in his book, A Critical Revision of the Genus Eucalyptus, and the names have been accepted by the Australian Plant Census:
 Eucalyptus ovata var. grandiflora Maiden;
 Eucalyptus ovata Labill. var. ovata''.

Distribution and habitat
Swamp gum is widespread in south-eastern Australia and is found from the western end of Kangaroo Island and the southern Mount Lofty ranges in the south-east of South Australia, to Tasmania, the southern half of Victoria and to south-eastern New South Wales as far north as Oberon and Hill Top. It grows in grassy woodland in low, temporarily or permanently damp sites.

References

ovata
Trees of Australia
Myrtales of Australia
Flora of Victoria (Australia)
Flora of New South Wales
Flora of South Australia
Flora of Tasmania
Taxa named by Jacques Labillardière
Plants described in 1806